Víctor Aurelio Álvarez (born November 8, 1976) is a Mexican former Major League Baseball pitcher. Álvarez was signed by the Los Angeles Dodgers as an undrafted free agent on May 16, .

Professional career

Los Angeles Dodgers
He went 4–1 with a 3.35 ERA in 12 games, eight for starts. He did not pitch in the  season.

In  Álvarez split time between the Class-A Vero Beach Dodgers and the Double-A San Antonio Missions. He went 4–4 with a 1.97 ERA in 12 games, all for starts, at Vero Beach. With the Missions he went 4–3 with a 3.97 ERA in nine games, all for starts.

Álvarez split the  season with Vero Beach, San Antonio and also the Diablos Rojos del México. He was 1–1 with Vero Beach and 0–3 with the Missions before the Dodgers loaned him to Mexico City. There he went 0–2 with a 6.33 ERA in seven games, six for starts.

He split the  season between the Double-A Jacksonville Suns and the Triple-A Las Vegas Stars. With the Suns he went 2–0 in eight starts with an impressive 1.20 ERA. He was soon called up the Starts where he went 7–4 with a 4.27 ERA in 20 starts.

In  he split the season between the Triple-A Las Vegas 51s and the Dodgers. With the 51s he was 10–7 with a 4.70 ERA in 34 games, 15 for starts. He made his major league debut on July 30, against the Cincinnati Reds, working 1.1 innings of relief and giving up 2 runs. He pitched in four games for the Dodgers in 2002 going 0–1 with a 4.36 ERA in one start.

Álvarez primarily played for Las Vegas in  but did have a short stint with the Dodgers. With the 51s he went 4–4 with a 2.70 ERA in 22 games, seven for starts. With L.A. he went 0–1 with a dismal 12.72 ERA in five games, all in relief.

Philadelphia Phillies
He was claimed on waivers by the Philadelphia Phillies after the 2003 season, but cut after spring training.

Mexican League
He compiled a 5–2 record in 18 games, 16 for starts, in the 2005 season.

In  he went 8–4 with a 4.27 ERA in 20 games, all for starts, with the Diablos Rojos.

He had a rocky  season but bounced back with an impressive . In 2007, he went 12–5 with a 5.41 ERA in 22 starts and in 2008 he went 9–5 with a 3.43 ERA in 19 starts.

He began the  season with the Diablos Rojos, but moved on to the Guerreros de Oaxaca after just one game. He started  back with the Guerreros, and later pitched for Veracruz.

External links

Baseball-Almanac

1976 births
Águilas de Mexicali players
Algodoneros de Guasave players
Baseball players from Sinaloa
Central American and Caribbean Games bronze medalists for Mexico
Competitors at the 2006 Central American and Caribbean Games
Diablos Rojos del México players
Great Falls Dodgers players
Guerreros de Oaxaca players
Jacksonville Suns players
Living people
Las Vegas 51s players
Los Angeles Dodgers players
Major League Baseball pitchers
Major League Baseball players from Mexico
Mexican expatriate baseball players in the United States
Mexican League baseball pitchers
Naranjeros de Hermosillo players
Olmecas de Tabasco players
Rojos del Águila de Veracruz players
San Antonio Missions players
Sportspeople from Culiacán
Tomateros de Culiacán players
Toros de Tijuana players
Vero Beach Dodgers players
Central American and Caribbean Games medalists in baseball